Maktab Sabah is a single-session secondary school located in the city of Kota Kinabalu, in the State of Sabah, Malaysia. The school was established in the year 1957, making Sabah College a historical institution as it was formed before the independence of Sabah.

As of the year 2021, the school has approximately 100 teachers and over 1300 students.

History

Establishment of Sabah College was suggested by the first education director of the North Borneo government, PE Perry in 1947. The purpose of this school is to help and provide education to potential and bright local children in North Borneo. Among the proposed construction sites are Likas (current SM All Saints site), Kepayan and current Queen Elizabeth Hospital. In 1956 its construction plans had been proposed to the British Government and granted.

During the construction project the Colonial Development Welfare has funded 90% of the cost. While the rest was contributed by local sources. The first intake consist of 85 students and 95 teachers. Only selected students which passed special exam were chosen to study at Maktab Sabah. The school acting principal was Buckley. In the same year, Geoffrey Clarke was appointed as the very first principal of Sabah College.

At the end of 1957 this school was moved to a new site near the current Secretariat building. In 1958 Form Six classes started with limited facility of classes lessons.

Then, in 1960, Sabah College once again moved to a new site.

Principals
Below are the principals who have served and led Sabah College since its establishment.

 G.C. Clarke (May 1957 – May 1963)
 F.J. Rawcliffe (May 1963 – Dec 1966)
 Siew Peng Foo (January 1967 – May 1970)
 Vincent T.Y. Shia (May 1970 – September 1976)
 Yong Foo Sang (September 1976 – May 1980)
 Mokhtar Senik (May 1980 – January 1981)
 Ahmad A. Staun (January 1981 – 1986)
 Dg. Haruni (1986–1991)
 Hasnah Yunan (1991 – August 1996)
 Ahmad Abdul Waham (September 1996 – May 1998)
 Julia Willie Jock (1998 – March 2006)
 Nuinda Alias (March 2006 – 6 January 2022)
 Nurani Fauziah Derin (7 January 2022 – present)

Alumni (OSCA)
A student pursuing his secondary education in Maktab Sabah is commonly known as a Sabah Collegian; once the individual leaves the school, he is an Old Sabah Collegian. The school's alumni, Old Sabah Collegians Alumni is commonly referred to by its abbreviation, OSCA.

Notable alumni 
 Malaya Ayalamshah Sibuku – state notary government surveyor
 Pandikar Amin Mulia – former Speaker of the Dewan Rakyat 
 Anifah Aman – former Malaysian Minister of Foreign Affairs 
 Maximus Ongkili – Malaysian cabinet minister (attended Form 6 in this school) 
 Masidi Manjun – former Sabah State Minister of Tourism, Culture and Environment
 Shafie Apdal – former Malaysian Minister of Rural and Regional Development, current Sabah Chief Minister (attended from Forms 1 to 3, lower secondary)
 Musa Aman – 14th Chief Minister of Sabah from 2003 to 2018 (alumnus in lower secondary, Forms 1 to 3)
 Nasir Sakaran – former Minister in the Chief Minister's Department of Sabah
 Yahya Hussin – former Deputy Chief Minister of Sabah 
 Abdul Rahim Ismail – former Minister of Agriculture and Food Industry of Sabah
 Tham Nyip Shen – former Deputy Chief Minister of Sabah
 Salleh Said Keruak – former Chief Minister and Former Minister of Housing and Local Government of Sabah and current Federal Cabinet Minister with rank of Senator as well as former State Legislative Assembly Speaker
 Nahalan OKK Damsal – former Minister of Sports and Tourism of Sabah
 Juhar Mahiruddin – current Governor of Sabah since 2011

External links
Official Website

Secondary schools in Malaysia
Publicly funded schools in Malaysia
Educational institutions established in 1957
1957 establishments in North Borneo